Gymnastics at the 2018 Asian Games was held at the Jakarta International Expo Hall D2, Jakarta, Indonesia, from 20 to 30 August 2018.

Schedule

Medalists

Men's artistic

Women's artistic

Rhythmic

Trampoline

Medal table

Participating nations
A total of 191 athletes from 25 nations competed in gymnastics at the 2018 Asian Games:

References

External links
Artistic Gymnastics at the 2018 Asian Games
Rhythmic Gymnastics at the 2018 Asian Games
Trampoline Gymnastics at the 2018 Asian Games
Official Result Book – Artistic Gymnastics
Official Result Book – Rhythmic Gymnastics
Official Result Book – Trampoline Gymnastics

 
2018
2018 Asian Games events
Asian Games
International gymnastics competitions hosted by Indonesia